The 2022-23 ISU Speed Skating World Cup was an international level speed skating tournament. The season consisted of 6 events, and began on 11 November 2022 in Stavanger, Norway and ended on 19 February 2023 in Tomaszów Mazowiecki, Poland. The World Cup is organised by the ISU who also runs world cups and championships in short track speed skating and figure skating.

Calendar

The calendar for the 2022–23 season.

World Cup standings

Medal Count

References

 
ISU
ISU